Pascal Caffet is a World-Champion and Meilleur Ouvrier de France French pastry confectioner and chocolate maker. He has shops in France, Italy, and Japan.

Company history 

In 1979 Bernard Caffet (Pascal's father) created the “Palais du chocolat” in Troyes, a pastry and chocolate shop in France. After the death of Bernard Caffet, Pascal and Florence took over the family-owned business in 1987.

 1989: Pascal becomes the “Meilleur Ouvrier de France Pâtissier” Best French Pastry Confectioner. He was only 27 years old, the youngest Meilleur Ouvrier in France.
 1990: Pascal and Florence decide to open a bigger shop, because the first one was too small to present all the products, pastries and chocolates.
 1996: Pascal becomes, for the first time, World Champion of chocolate and pastries.
 2004: Opening of the second shop in Troyes, close to the new factory.
 2004: Pascal Caffet's first shop in Japan opens.
 2007: The third shop opens in Troyes, and the second shop in Japan opens.
 2008: Pascal and Florence decide to start the first shop in Paris in the very “chic” Quartier Saint-Germain.
 2008: The “Club des Croqueurs de Chocolat”, gives an award to Pascal Caffet for the very high quality of his chocolates.
 2010: The first Italian shop opens in Turin.
 2013: The Maison Pascal Caffet is now established in the capital of Champagne, Reims.
 2014: Pascal Caffet opens 2 shops in Paris (16ème and 17ème arrondissements.
 2015: Pascal Caffet distributes its products in London, United Kingdom.

Awards 
 2013: Apprentice Mathieu Blandin wins the gold medal at the Pastry World-Championship
 2009: Best chocolate maker in France
 2003: Gold Medal Pastry & Chocolate World-Championship (Champion du Monde). Lyon, France
 Silver & Bronze medal Chocolate World-Championship. Las Vegas, United States - 2002 & 2004
 1996: Gold medal Pastry & Chocolate World-Championship (Champion du Monde). Milano, Italy
 1989: Best French Pastry Confectioner (Meilleur Ouvrier de France)

See also
 List of chocolatiers

References

External links 
 http://www.pascal-caffet.com France
 http://www.pascalcaffet.co.uk UK

Living people
French chefs
Pastry chefs
Chocolatiers
Chocolateries
1962 births
People from Troyes
Businesspeople in confectionery